Sebastian Strandberg (born June 4, 1992) is a Swedish professional ice hockey forward who currently plays for Linköping HC in the Swedish Hockey League (SHL).

Playing career
Strandberg made his professional debut in his native Sweden with HV71 in the Elitserien during the 2010–11 Elitserien season.

During the 2014–15 season, after he was scoreless in 24 games with HV71 Strandberg was loaned to the Malmö Redhawks in the Allsvenskan on October 18, 2014. Strandberg ended his longstanding partnership with HV71 in the off-season, initially signing a contract with VIK Västerås HK before he was released just over a week later on August 14, 2015.

As a free agent, Strandberg opted to travel North America in agreeing to a one-year ECHL contract with the Evansville IceMen on September 8, 2015.

References

External links

1992 births
Djurgårdens IF Hockey players
Evansville IceMen players
HV71 players
Linköping HC players
Living people
Malmö Redhawks players
Odense Bulldogs players
Swedish ice hockey centres
Sportspeople from Jönköping